This is a list of listed buildings in Ærø Municipality, Denmark.

The list

5970 Ærøskøbing

5985 Søby Ærø

Delisted buildings

References

External links

 Danish Agency of Culture

Ærø